Kyaikpun Pagoda, is a pagoda in Bago, Myanmar. Most notably, Kyaik Pun Pagoda is the home to the Four Seated Buddha shrine, a  statue depicting the four Buddhas namely Kakusandha, Konagamana, Kassapa, and Gautama seated in four positions, sitting back to back to four directions. According to tradition, the Four Seated Buddha was built by King Migadippa of Bago the 7th Century AD. It was renovated by King Dhammazedi in the late 15th century.

Gallery

Notes

References

Pagodas in Myanmar
15th-century Buddhist temples